National Institute of Urban Infrastructure Planning, the brainchild of Dr. Murtaza Haider (Ast. Prof. McGill University 2002–2006, Asoc. Prof. Ryerson University (now Toronto Metropolitan University) 2006–current) is established at University of Engineering and Technology (Peshawar) (UET, Peshawar) with the grant of US$3.0 million from Higher Education Commission (HEC) of Pakistan. Main focus of NIUIP is to address the persistent urban decay and research in improvement of urban infrastructure of Pakistan.

History 

In December 2003, Professor Haider, attended the Urban Research Symposium in Washington, DC, which was organized by the World Bank.   The interactions with urban planners and engineers from the developing countries gave birth to the idea of establishing a new infrastructure planning institute in Pakistan.  Later in June and July 2004, Professor Haider visited the National Institute of Urban Affairs, India and the National Institute of Public Finance and Policy, India, both located in New Delhi, to learn from the experience of Indian planners.

Professor Haider contacted UET Peshawar and the HEC with suggestions to address Pakistan’s urban challenges in a systematic manner. Dr. Sohail Naqvi, executive director of the HEC, was equally concerned about the urban decay in Pakistan.  Professor Haider, who specializes in urban planning and is also an alumnus of UET Peshawar, offered his assistance and Canadian expertise in establishing a National Institute of Urban Infrastructure Planning to be based at UET Peshawar. HEC engaged Professor Haider under the reverse brain drain program to develop the detail proposal for NIUIP. In the start of 2005 HEC approved the proposal and NIUIP was formally established at UET, Peshawar.

Objectives 

Main objectives of formation of NIUIP are to:

 Undertake research in challenges faced by rapidly deteriorating urban centers of Pakistan
 Transform it into a centre of excellence for research and training in urban infrastructure planning in Pakistan
 Train and educate Doctoral and Master students by providing opportunities for research in an applied and problem-solving environment
 Train planning professionals
 Develop collaboration with other such international research institutes

Research linkages 

In September 2005, a Memorandum of Understanding was signed between McGill and NIUIP, UET Peshawar for cooperation through activities as:

 Exchange of faculty and/or staff
 Joint research activities and publications
 Participation in seminars and academic meetings
 Special short-term academic programs

Faculty development and research areas 

Initial research focus of NIUIP is in:

 Infrastructure finance and planning
 Urban transportation planning 
 Urban environment and energy planning
 Water supply and sanitation
 Solid waste management
 Spatial modeling and GIS

References 

 Reginomics Projects 
 NIUIP PC1
 MoU between McGill and UET, Peshawar
 UET, Peshawar 
University of Engineering and Technology (Peshawar)
 Prof. Murtaza Haider's Resume 

Urban planning in Pakistan
University of Engineering & Technology, Peshawar